WWE Saturday Morning Slam is a short-lived American professional wrestling television show that was produced by the WWE. It aired as part of the Vortexx Saturday morning block launch on The CW from August 25, 2012 to May 11, 2013. The program had a TV Parental Guidelines rating of TV-G and TV-Y7 FV to meet the guidelines of the timeslot, thus more aggressive wrestling moves permissible under a broader TV-PG rating were unseen. The show was cancelled after one season on as The CW Vortexx owner Saban Brands and WWE disagreed on its future creative direction. It marked the WWE's first Saturday morning pro-wrestling show since Livewire in 2001. It is one of the WWE programming not yet shown on the WWE Network.

Production
Saturday Morning Slam was taped on Tuesdays before WWE Friday Night SmackDown.

In February 2013, WWE announced that a General Manager for the show would be revealed on March 16, 2013. Mick Foley was revealed as the General Manager, where he would serve as such until his contract expired in March 2014.

General Managers

Hosts

Commentators

(*) Multiple WWE wrestlers served as guest commentators alongside Josh Matthews.

Ring announcers

Rating 
WWE Saturday Morning Slam aired on The CW Vortexx programming block on Saturday mornings. While all WWE programming is rated TV-PG, Saturday Morning Slam was rated TV-G to cater to the children's demographic. As a result of this, moves or holds that targeting the head or neck were cut away from the show.

Cancellation 
On May 12, 2013, The CW Vortexx announced that WWE Saturday Morning Slam had been canceled as a result of running for one season. In June 2013, It was announced that WWE would not renew Saturday Morning Slam for a second season.

See also

List of former WWE television programming

References

External links
Official website

2012 American television series debuts
2013 American television series endings
2010s American children's television series
Saturday Morning Slam
The CW original programming